RPN DZKI-TV, channel 10, is a television station of Radio Philippines Network. Its new state of the art transmitter is located at Bonacua Building, Iriga-Baao road, Brgy. San Nicolas, Iriga City, Camarines Sur. This station underwent rehabilitation and is now broadcasting in full power, was officially relaunched as CNN Philippines.

Areas of coverage

Market audience
 Iriga, Naga and the province of Camarines Sur and also throughout Bicol Region (especially in Northern Albay)

Note: Areas receiving signals may vary. This channel had Co-channel interference with ABS-CBN TV 10 Tabaco until 2020, when it was shut down due to franchise expiration.

See also
 Radio Philippines Network
 List of Radio Philippines Network affiliate stations

Television stations in Camarines Sur
Radio Philippines Network stations
Television channels and stations established in 1972